Dictyotaceae is large family of brown algae (class Phaeophyceae).  Members of this family generally prefer warmer waters than other brown algae. Lobophora variegata (= Pocockiella varieagata) often presents a beautiful blue iridescence due to microscopic bacteria which live on the surface of the blades . A number of genera are known as forkweed (e.g. Dictyota, Glosophora, Dilophus, Dictyopteris, Pachydictyon and Lobospira.

References

Further reading

Algae
Aquatic plants
Brown algae families
 
Dictyotales
Ochrophyta
Plant families
Plants described in 1822
Seaweeds